Beitar Ironi Ma'ale Adumim was an Israeli women's football club from Ma'ale Adumim who competed in the Israeli Second Division and the Ligat Nashim Shniya Cup. The club existed for one season only before folding.

History
The club was established in 2012 and joined Ligat Nashim, entering in the second division. The club won just two matches during the season, both against fellow bottom table strugglers, F.C. Kafr Yasif and lost the rest of the matches, to finish bottom of the table. The club competed in the Second Division Cup, as in this season, the Israeli Women's Cup was contested by the top division's teams only. The club played Bnot Tiv'on in the cup's quarter-finals, and lost on penalties.

External links
 Beitar Ironi Ma'ale Adumim Israeli Football Association 
 2012–13 Ligat Nashim Shniya Israeli Football Association 

Women's football clubs in Israel
Association football clubs established in 2012
Association football clubs disestablished in 2013
Defunct football clubs in Israel
Ma'ale Adumim